Niku may refer to:
 
 An alternate transliteration of Necho II, King of Egypt
 A common verbal and written shorthand for Nikumaroro island
 Niku, a business automation company acquired by CA, Inc. (Computer Associates) in 2005
 The Norwegian Institute for Cultural Heritage Research (Norsk institutt for kulturminneforskning - NIKU)
 "niku" (肉) means "meat" in Japanese
Nickname of character Sena Kashiwazaki from Haganai novel/anime series.
 Niku, a nickname for Nikumaroro, formerly known as Gardner Island
 , nicknamed Niku, a trans-Neptunian object with an abnormal solar orbit.

People with the name
 Niku Kheradmand, Iranian actress and film dubber
 Niku Kruger, South African-born American rugby player
 Tapani Niku, Finnish cross-country skier (bronze medal in 1924 Winter Olympics)